Twinkletoes is a nickname of:

People with the nickname 

 George Curtis (footballer, born 1919) (1919–2004), English football player and coach
 Laurie Dwyer (1938–2016), Australian rules footballer
 Ronald Meadows (1931–1985), Australian rugby union player – see Newcastle and Hunter Rugby Union
 Leo Paquin (1910–1993), American college football player
 George Selkirk (1908–1987), Canadian Major League Baseball player and executive
 Cyril Williams (1921–1980), English footballer

Fictional characters with the nickname 

 Aang, protagonist of the animated television series Avatar: The Last Airbender. Due to his light-footed, stealth-like Airbending moves, Toph has difficulty honing in on his position in battle because of her blindness, despite her ability to “see” with Earthbending. Toph actually refers to him as “Twinkle Toes” more than his actual name throughout the remainder of the series and even during the spin-off series, The Legend of Korra. Flashback visions during its first season showed an adult Toph still calling Aang the name, all to Aang’s disliking. In a full circle moment, Toph even calls Avatar Korra the name while sensing the light spirit Raava inside of her that once possessed her late Avatar pupil and friend.
 Fred Flintstone, main character of the animated television series The Flintstones and other works
 Lady, a tank engine and supporting character of the theatrical live-adaptation of the television series Thomas & Friends called Thomas and the Magic Railroad. The evil diesel engine, Diesel 10, refers to her as “Twinkle Toes” several times while trying to hunt her down, likely due to her special ability to scatter gold dust particles behind as she travels and her delicate, fanciful, gentle nature.

See also 

Lists of people by nickname